Slugterra is an animated television series created by Asaph Fipke. The series was produced by the Canadian animation studio Nerd Corps Entertainment, a subsidiary of DHX Media. It premiered on Disney XD Canada on September 3, 2012 and began broadcasting in the United States the following month. The series was streamed on Netflix from 2016 to 2018, and is currently available on other platforms.

During its 4 year run, Slugterra consisted of 4 seasons; 6 feature films; and had a total runtime of 1,386 minutes, with 63 20-minute episodes. Additionally, the series also consisted of 81 minutes of Slugisodes.Several products tied to the series have been released, including both action figures and video games like the mobile game.

Synopsis
Deep inside the earth exists the vast underground world of Slugterra, named after the tiny slugs who live there. The Shane family are the traditional guardians of Slugterra and have kept its existence secret from the world as they train the slugs for use as living ammunition. A threat appears in the form of Dr. Thaddius Blakk, who wants to transform the Slugs into evil weapons he calls "ghouls." Fifteen-year-old Eli Shane must take his place as the new guardian of Slugterra and, with the help of the slugs and his gang, stop Dr. Blakk.

Major Characters

 Will Shane (voice: Sam Vincent)--Father of Eli Shane, The Protector of Slugterra
 Eli Shane (voice: Sam Vincent)--The series' protagonist, Eli becomes the new Protector of Slugterra when his father Will Shane goes missing.
 Kord Zane (voice: Andrew Francis)--A huge cave troll. He is a mechanic who fixes the team's Mecha beasts and upgrades their blasters. His favorite thing to do is play practical jokes, usually on Pronto. 
 Pronto Geronimole (voice: Lee Tockar)--A proud and knowledgeable molenoid tracker. Claims to be a master rogue, slugslinger and adventurer but is known throughout the show for being the comic relief and constantly getting into trouble.
 Trixie Sting (voice: Shannon Chan-Kent)--Vlogger and the Shane Gang's resident slug expert. Trixie's dream is to make a documentary about the slugs.
 Junjie (voice: Vincent Tong)--A hero from the Eastern Caverns and master of the art of "Slug Fu," a way of controlling fired slugs with the mind.
 Dr. Thaddeus Blakk (voice: Mark Oliver)--Owner of Blakk industries. His business dealings and the creation of the Slugterran Express train have made him rich and powerful. His business hides his true intent: to control all of Slugterra and destroy the magical slug energy that protects it.
 Thaddius "Tad" D. Justin Blakk (Voice: Adrian Petriw)--Son of Dr Blakk, who came from the surface alongside his slug. Tad befriends the Shane Gang and they teach him the basics of Slugslinging.

Episodes

Slugisodes
From 2012 to 2016, 80 Slugisodes were aired.

"The new animated action-comedy ‘Slugisodes’ (20 x 5’) is currently in development with WildBrain. The 2D animated shorts are targeted to launch in 2020, including on YouTube, managed by DHX's WildBrain. Through a non-dialogue serialized arc, the ‘Slugisodes’ will feature the Slugs from the hit international show, as well as introducing new Slugs and locations". After a four year hiatus,  a Slugisode, “Joules VS. Bludgeon battle”, was released on September 12, 2020.

Slugterra: Ascension
It was announced that a new spin-off Slugterra series, Slugterra: Ascension, would be released, with a sneak peek premiere on September 5, 2022 . The series, consisting of 20 four-minute-long shorts, explores the adventure of Eli and Trixie against Locke and Lode.

Home media
Shout! Factory released Slugterra: Return Of The Shane Gang, the first DVD collection of the show, on February 12, 2013. The second collection, Slugterra: Slugs Unleashed, was released on June 18, 2013, with Slugterra: Slug Power! following on September 17, in the UK Platform Entertainment Ltd. released episodes on DVD.

References
 http://kidscreen.com/2012/10/24/slugterra-blasts-into-southern-europe/
 https://web.archive.org/web/20120315065120/http://www.toonzone.net/news/articles/42166/pr-disney-xds-live-action-and-animation-schedule-presented-to-advertisers/
 https://www.wildbrain.com/newsreleases/wildbrain-television-announces-three-more-original-greenlights-from-canadian-producers-exclusive-to-family-channel/

External links

 Slugterra
 
 
 
 Slugterra France

Disney XD original programming
Dueling
Fictional gastropods
2010s American animated television series
2012 American television series debuts
2016 American television series endings
2010s Canadian animated television series
2012 Canadian television series debuts
2016 Canadian television series endings
Anime-influenced Western animated television series
American children's animated action television series
American children's animated adventure television series
American children's animated science fantasy television series
American computer-animated television series
Canadian children's animated action television series
Canadian children's animated adventure television series
Canadian children's animated science fantasy television series
Canadian computer-animated television series
Television series by DHX Media
English-language television shows